Johannes Voldemar Veski (27 June 1873 Vaidavere, Tartu County – 28 March 1968 Tartu) was an Estonian linguist. 

From 1896 until 1899, he studied at the University of Tartu; at the beginning he studied religion and thereafter nature sciences. From 1920 until 1938, he taught at the University of Tartu.

Since 1946 he was a member of Estonian Academy of Sciences. 1946-1968 he was the chairperson of Mother Tongue Society.

His activity was primarily related to the developing Estonian language terminology, and Estonian language planning. In total, he was an editor or compiler of 30 specialised dictionaries (all of them consist of about 150,000 terms).

Awards
 1938: Order of the White Star, III class.

References

1873 births
1968 deaths
Linguists from Estonia
Recipients of the Order of the White Star, 3rd Class
University of Tartu alumni
Academic staff of the University of Tartu
People from Jõgeva Parish